The Wilcox County Courthouse in Abbeville, Georgia was built in 1903.  It was designed by architect Frank P. Milburn, who also designed several other Georgia courthouses.

Its facade features cream-colored brick and stone trim.  It has two Ionic tetrastyle porches.

In 1980, the courthouse building stood out as impressive relative to the surrounding crossroads community of Abbeville, and it could be seen for miles.

References

Courthouses on the National Register of Historic Places in Georgia (U.S. state)
Neoclassical architecture in Georgia (U.S. state)
Government buildings completed in 1903
National Register of Historic Places in Wilcox County, Georgia
County courthouses in Georgia (U.S. state)
Buildings and structures in Wilcox County, Georgia